Tha Carter is the fourth studio album by American rapper Lil Wayne. It was released on June 29, 2004, by Cash Money Records and Universal Records. The production on the album was mostly handled by Cash Money's former in-house producer Mannie Fresh, before Mannie left the label.  The album spawned four sequels: Tha Carter II, Tha Carter III, Tha Carter IV, and Tha Carter V.

The album debuted at number five on the US Billboard 200 chart, selling 116,000 copies in its first week. The album was later certified platinum by the Recording Industry Association of America (RIAA) in September 2020.

Singles 
The album's lead single, "Bring It Back" was released on April 10, 2004, while its second single, "Go D.J." was released on October 5, 2004. Both songs were produced by and featured guest vocals from then-Cash Money's frequent record producer Mannie Fresh.

The album's third single, "Earthquake" was released on March 27, 2005. The song was produced by and featured guest vocals from fellow record producer Jazze Pha.

Commercial performance 
Tha Carter debuted at number five on the US Billboard 200 chart, selling 116,000 copies in its first week. This became Wayne's third US top-ten debut. As of November 2005, the album has sold 878,000 copies in the US, according to Nielsen SoundScan. On September 25, 2020, the album was certified 2× platinum by the Recording Industry Association of America (RIAA) for combined sales and album-equivalent units of two million units in the United States.

Track listing 

 If the album was purchased in Canada, "Walk In", "Inside" and "Walk Out" are recorded on a different instrumental, with slightly different lyrics. Also, "Earthquake" is replaced by the song "Crack Ya Bottle" by Lil Wayne featuring Reel, produced by the Architects. These changes are a result of sample clearance issues.
 "Earthquake" interpolates and samples "Let's Stay Together" by Al Green.

Charts

Weekly charts

Year-end charts

Certifications

References 

2004 albums
Lil Wayne albums
Universal Records albums
Cash Money Records albums
Albums produced by Jazze Pha
Albums produced by Mannie Fresh